Goltappeh-ye Hasanabad (also Romanized as Goltappeh-ye Ḩasanābād; also known as Gol Tappeh) is a village in Qaflankuh-e Sharqi Rural District, Kaghazkonan District, Meyaneh County, East Azerbaijan Province, Iran. At the 2006 census, its population was 275, in 71 families.

References 

Populated places in Meyaneh County